Johann Heinrich Roos (29 September 1631, Otterberg – 3 October 1685, Frankfurt) was a German Baroque era landscape painter and etcher.

Biography
His family had emigrated to Amsterdam due to the Thirty Years' War in 1640. He trained with Guilliam du Gardijn, Cornelis de Bie and Barent Graat, but the landscape painters Nicolaes Berchem and Karel Dujardin were more of an influence on him. In 1653 the Roos family returned to Germany, where Johann and his brother Theodor Roos worked together on a commission for a cloister in Mainz.

Between 1654 and 1659, Johann worked for Ernst, Landgrave of Hesse-Rheinfels (son of Maurice, lived 1623–1693), where he painted a portrait of A Prince (1654, Heidelberg, Kurpfälzisches Museum) and religious scenes. In 1664 he was invited to paint at the court of Charles I Louis, Elector Palatine. Due to unsatisfactory working conditions, he moved with his family to Frankfurt in 1667 and was very successful, but lost everything in a fire in 1685. He died trying to save his belongings. Four sons and a daughter survived to become good painters.

Though not registered as a pupil of Rembrandt, he made a copy of a painting by Rembrandt that he saw presumably in Amsterdam while he trained there from 1647 to 1653:

Works

Roos specialized in pastoral idylls, idealized landscapes with ancient ruins. He found inspiration in engravings. These pastoral scenes represent the longing of Roos for harmony between men and animals with nature. Among biblical, historical and genre scenes, Roos preferred subjects involving animals: the shepherds of the nativity, Venus and Adonis.
Roos was also one of the finest German portrait painters of his time. He painted princes, noble ladies and officers, but also Frankfurt middle classes.
Roos worked too from many individual drawings (Albertina, Vienne), mostly of domestic animals. He intensified the individuality of each species.

Gallery of animals (ca. 1668–1670)

Public collections
Roos is represented in the following collections : Kunsthistorisches Museum, Vienna; Städelsches Kunstinstitut, Frankfurt; Fine Arts Museum of San Francisco; Detroit Institute of Arts, Michigan; Dulwich Picture Gallery, London; Crocker Art Museum, California; Indianapolis Museum of Art, Indiana; Dallas Museum of Art, Texas; Palazzo Bianco, Genoa, amongst others.

Family
His sons Philipp Peter Roos (Rosa di Tivoli) and Johann Melchior Roos were also renowned painters.  Their works are represented in museums at Frankfurt, Cologne, Dessau, Darmstadt and Stuttgart.

Notes

References
 Bolton, Roy (2009). Old Master Paintings & Drawings, London, Sphinx Books, p. 388.

External links

Artcyclopedia info
Columbia Encyclopedia entry
Roos at the Kunsthistorisches Museum
Roos at the Fine Arts Museum of San Francisco
Roos at the Detroit Institute of Arts
Roos at the Dulwich Picture Gallery

1631 births
1685 deaths
17th-century German painters
German male painters
German Baroque painters
People from Kaiserslautern